Butler County is a county in the U.S. state of Nebraska. As of the 2020 United States Census, the population was 8,369. Its county seat is David City. The county was created in 1856 and organized in 1868.

In the Nebraska license plate system, Butler County is represented by the prefix 25 (when the license plate system was established in 1922, it had the 25th-largest number of vehicles registered of all counties in the state).

In 2010, Nebraska's center of population was in Butler County, near the village of Rising City.

Name
There is some uncertainty about how Butler County got its name. The most credible consensus seems to be that Butler County is named for William Orlando Butler, a U.S. congressman from Kentucky and U.S. Army major general who served during the Mexican–American War. Butler was offered the job of Governor of Nebraska Territory in 1854 by President Franklin Pierce, but he turned it down. Regardless, Butler County was still named in his honor. The earliest references to the county being called "Butler County" are found in the journals of the Nebraska Territorial Legislature from the years 1857 and 1858.

Another common explanation proposed for the naming of Butler County is that it was named for David Butler, the first Governor of the State of Nebraska. However, Butler County was created by an act of the Nebraska Territorial Legislature on June 26, 1856, and was referred to as "Butler County" more than ten years before David Butler became Governor of Nebraska and two years before he had even moved to Nebraska from Indiana in 1859. When David Butler came to Nebraska, he settled in Pawnee County, not in the Butler County area. Confusingly, however, the name for the county seat of Butler County, David City, is also sometimes attributed to David Butler, but there are also conflicting sources concerning its origin. A second alternate explanation for the origin of Butler County's name is given in Andreas' History of Nebraska. It seems to indicate that the county might have been named for William Butler, an early settler who moved to the area in 1860 and became county sheriff in 1868. However, as noted before, the county had been in existence and had been referred to as "Butler County" well before that point in time.

Geography

Major highways

  U.S. Highway 81
  Nebraska Highway 15
  Nebraska Highway 64
  Nebraska Highway 66
  Nebraska Highway 92

Adjacent counties

 Saunders County – east
 Seward County – south
 York County – southwest
 Polk County – west
 Platte County – northwest
 Colfax County – north

Demographics

As of the 2000 United States Census, there were 8,767 people, 3,426 households, and 2,350 families in the county. The population density was 15 people per square mile (6/km2). There were 3,901 housing units at an average density of 7 per square mile (3/km2). The racial makeup of the county was 98.38% White, 0.10% Black or African American, 0.13% Native American, 0.13% Asian, 0.06% Pacific Islander, 0.81% from other races, and 0.40% from two or more races. 1.65% of the population were Hispanic or Latino of any race. 33.1% were of German and 32.0% Czech ancestry.

There were 3,426 households, out of which 33.00% had children under the age of 18 living with them, 59.90% were married couples living together, 5.70% had a female householder with no husband present, and 31.40% were non-families. 28.30% of all households were made up of individuals, and 14.40% had someone living alone who was 65 years of age or older. The average household size was 2.53 and the average family size was 3.13.

The county population contained 27.90% under the age of 18, 6.60% from 18 to 24, 25.30% from 25 to 44, 22.50% from 45 to 64, and 17.70% who were 65 years of age or older. The median age was 39 years. For every 100 females there were 104.10 males. For every 100 females age 18 and over, there were 101.20 males.

The median income for a household in the county was $36,331, and the median income for a family was $44,441. Males had a median income of $28,856 versus $20,979 for females. The per capita income for the county was $16,394.  About 4.80% of families and 8.20% of the population were below the poverty line, including 9.80% of those under age 18 and 9.40% of those age 65 or over.

Communities

City
 David City (county seat)

Villages

 Abie
 Bellwood
 Brainard
 Bruno
 Dwight
 Garrison
 Linwood
 Octavia
 Rising City
 Surprise
 Ulysses

Unincorporated communities
 Appleton
 Edholm
 Loma
 Millerton
 Nimburg

Ghost towns
 Savannah

Townships

 Alexis
 Bone Creek
 Center
 Franklin
 Linwood
 Oak Creek
 Olive
 Platte
 Plum Creek
 Read
 Reading
 Richardson
 Savannah
 Skull Creek
 Summit
 Ulysses
 Union

Politics
Butler County voters have been reliably Republican for decades. No Democratic Party candidate has carried the county in any national election since 1976.

See also
National Register of Historic Places listings in Butler County, Nebraska

References

 
Nebraska counties
Czech-American culture in Nebraska
1868 establishments in Nebraska
Populated places established in 1868